Border Downs may refer to:

Border Downs, New South Wales, a town in Australia
Border Downs/Tintinara Crows, an Australian rules football club in the Mallee Football League (South Australia)

See also
Border Down, a horizontal scrolling shooter arcade game created in 2003